Repulse may refer to:

Places 
 Repulse Island National Park, Queensland, Australia
 Repulse Bay, Hong Kong
 Repulse Bay Beach, a beach in Repulse Bay, Hong Kong
 The Repulse Bay, a residential building in Repulse Bay, Hong Kong
 Naujaat, formerly Repulse Bay, Nunavut, Canada
 Repulse Bay Airport
Repulse Harbour, Greenland

Shipping 
 HMS Repulse, several ships of the Royal Navy
 Repulse-class ship of the line

Other 
 Repulse Power Station, Tasmania, Australia
 Repulse (arcade game), a 1985 arcade video game by Sega

See also 
 Repulsion (disambiguation)